Torreyochloa pallida var. fernaldii, also called Fernald's false manna grass, is a perennial flowering grass found across Canada and the northeastern United States. It is also known as Puccinellia fernaldii, Glyceria pallida var. fernaldii, Glyceria fernaldii, and Torreyochloa fernaldii.

Description
It has leaves with blades 1.5–3.5 mm wide and ligules 2.5–6.5 mm long. Its anthers are 0.3–0.5 mm long.

Distribution and habitat
It is found across the northeastern U.S. and Great Lakes states and in most of southern Canada, excepting Alberta. There are also populations in Tennessee and Wyoming.

Conservation
It is listed as endangered in Maryland and Kentucky, and special concern in Tennessee.

References

Pooideae
Grasses of North America